Chambré Brabazon Ponsonby (1720 – 20 February 1762) was an Irish Member of Parliament.

He was the son of Major-General Henry Ponsonby by his wife Lady Frances, daughter of Chambré Brabazon, 5th Earl of Meath. His paternal grandfather was William Ponsonby, 1st Viscount Duncannon and Brabazon Ponsonby, 1st Earl of Bessborough was his uncle.

He sat in the Irish House of Commons as member for Newtownards from 1750 to 1761.

On 28 September 1746 he married Elizabeth, daughter of Edward Clarke. They had one daughter, Frances, who married George Lowther of Kilrue on 28 July 1767.

He married a second time on 23 October 1752, to Louisa, daughter of Henry Lyons of Belmont. They had one daughter, Sarah, who lived at Plas Newydd with Eleanor Butler (daughter of Walter Butler of Kilkenny Castle), where they were known as the Ladies of Llangollen.

By his third wife, Mary, daughter of Sir William Barker, 3rd Baronet of Kilcooly Abbey, he was the father of Mary, who married Thomas Barton of Grove House, Fethard, and of Chambré Brabazon Ponsonby-Barker.

1762 deaths
Year of birth uncertain
Irish MPs 1727–1760
Members of the Parliament of Ireland (pre-1801) for County Down constituencies